Karen Maud Rasmussen (later Pedersen, 27 June 1906 – 5 September 1994) was a Danish freestyle swimmer who competed in the 1924 Summer Olympics. She was born and died in Copenhagen. In 1924 she was a member of the Danish relay team which finished fourth in the 4×100 metre freestyle relay competition. In the 100 metre freestyle event she was eliminated in the first round.

References

External links
profile

1906 births
1994 deaths
Danish female swimmers
Olympic swimmers of Denmark
Swimmers at the 1924 Summer Olympics
Danish female freestyle swimmers
Swimmers from Copenhagen